Bleker is a surname. Notable people with the surname include:

 Gerrit Claesz Bleker (1592–1656), Dutch painter
 Dirck Bleker (1621–1702), Dutch painter, son of Gerrit
 Henk Bleker (born 1953), Dutch politician and jurist
 Lars Bleker (born 1994), German footballer